Abdul Hafiz   (4 September 19256 April 1944) was an Punjabi Muslim recipient of the Victoria Cross, the highest and most prestigious award for gallantry in the face of the enemy that can be awarded to British and Commonwealth forces. He was the youngest Indian recipient of the award.

His was one of three World War II VC's awarded for action in British India, the others being awarded to John Pennington Harman and John Niel Randle both at the Battle of Kohima.

Details 

He was 18 years old , and serving as Naib Subedar in the 9th Jat Regiment, British Indian Army during World War II, when he performed the deeds for which he was awarded the VC.

On 6 April 1944, during the Battle of Imphal, Naib Subedar Abdul Hafiz  Khan was ordered to attack with his platoon a prominent position held by the enemy, the only approach to which was across a bare slope and then up a very steep hill. The Naib Subedar led the assault, himself killing several of the enemy, pressing on regardless of machine-gun fire. He received two wounds, the second of which was fatal; but he had succeeded in routing an enemy vastly superior in numbers, and had captured a most important position.

The citation reads as follows:

The Medal 
His VC is on display in the Lord Ashcroft Gallery at the Imperial War Museum, London.

References

External links 
 Abdul Hafiz
 Burial location

1925 births
1944 deaths
Indian World War II recipients of the Victoria Cross
British Indian Army officers
Indian Army personnel killed in World War II
People from Gurdaspur district
Military personnel of British India